'Quarterman is a surname. Notable people with the surname include:
Charlie Quarterman (born 1998), British cyclist
Cynthia L. Quarterman, American lawyer
Dernard E. Quarterman, American politician
Elsie Quarterman (1910–2014), American plant ecologist
Joe Quarterman, American singer
John Quarterman (born 1954), American writer
Kurt Quarterman (born 1983), American football guard
Lloyd Quarterman (1918–1982), American chemist
Shaquille Quarterman (born 1997), American football linebacker
Tim Quarterman (born 1994), American basketball player

See also
Jimenez v. Quarterman, court case decided in 2009 by the Supreme Court of the United States
Panetti v. Quarterman, court case decided in 2007 by the Supreme Court of the United States